Pedro Vázquez may refer to:
Pedro Vázquez (politician) (1934–2011), Puerto Rican politician
Pedro Vázquez Colmenares (1934–2012), Mexican politician
Pedro Vázquez González (born 1953), Mexican politician
Pedro Vázquez (footballer) (born 1989), Spanish footballer
Pedro Vázquez (canoeist) (born 1996), Spanish canoeist

See also 
Pedro Vásquez (1591–1624), Spanish missionary
Pedro Vásquez de Velasco (1657–1714), Peruvian bishop 
Pedro Nel Ospina Vázquez (1858–1927), Colombian former president
Pedro Ramírez Vázquez (1919–2013), Mexican architect